Berberis haoi is a species of flowering plant in the family Berberidaceae, first described in 1999. It is endemic to Gansu Province in northwestern China.

Berberis haoi is a shrub up to 1 m tall. Leaves are deciduous, simple, narrowly oblanceolate to elliptical. Inflorescence is a raceme of 6-10 flowers. Berries are ellipsoid, each with 2 seeds.

References

haoi
Flora of Gansu
Plants described in 1999